Justice Shaw may refer to:

Duncan Shaw (judge), justice of the British Columbia Supreme Court 
Elwyn Riley Shaw, justice of the Supreme Court of Illinois
Greg Shaw (judge), justice of the Alabama Supreme Court
Leander J. Shaw Jr., chief justice of the Florida Supreme Court
Lemuel Shaw, justice of the Massachusetts Supreme Judicial Court
Lucien Shaw (1845–1933), chief justice of the Supreme Court of California

See also
Judge Shaw (disambiguation)